Franck Schott (born May 16, 1970 in Saint-Paul, Réunion) is a retired backstroke and freestyle swimmer from France, who represented his native country at three consecutive Summer Olympics, starting in 1988. He won a bronze and a silver medal at the 1991 European Long Course Championships in Athens, Greece.

References
 
 

French male backstroke swimmers
French male freestyle swimmers
Swimmers at the 1988 Summer Olympics
Swimmers at the 1992 Summer Olympics
Swimmers at the 1996 Summer Olympics
Olympic swimmers of France
1970 births
Living people
Place of birth missing (living people)
European Aquatics Championships medalists in swimming
Mediterranean Games gold medalists for France
Swimmers at the 1991 Mediterranean Games
Swimmers at the 1993 Mediterranean Games
Sportspeople from Réunion
Mediterranean Games medalists in swimming